Arsenaria indistinctalis is a species of snout moth in the genus Arsenaria. It was described by Hans Georg Amsel in 1949 and is known from Iran.

References

Moths described in 1949
Hypotiini
Moths of Asia